Malawi competed at the 2020 Summer Olympics in Tokyo. Originally scheduled to take place from 24 July to 9 August 2020, the Games were postponed to 23 July to 8 August 2021, because of the COVID-19 pandemic. It was the nation's eleventh appearance at the Summer Olympics. Malawi did not attend the 1976 Summer Olympics in Montreal and the 1980 Summer Olympics in Moscow, because of its support to the African and United States-led boycott.

Competitors
The following is the list of number of competitors in the Games.

Archery

Malawi received an invitation from the Tripartite Commission to send a male archer for the second consecutive time to the Olympic tournament.

Athletics

Malawi received a universality slot from World Athletics to send a female track and field athlete to the Olympics.

Track & road events

Judo

For the first time in history, Malawi received an invitation from the Tripartite Commission and the International Judo Federation to send Harriet Boniface in the women's extra-lightweight category (48 kg) to the Olympics.

Swimming

Malawi received a universality invitation from FINA to send two top-ranked swimmers (one per gender) in their respective individual events to the Olympics, based on the FINA Points System of June 28, 2021.

References

Nations at the 2020 Summer Olympics
2020
2021 in Malawian sport